Programmed cell death protein 4 is a protein that in humans is encoded by the PDCD4 gene. It is one of the targets of an oncomiR, MIRN21.

Function 

This gene encodes a protein localized to the nucleus in proliferating cells. Expression of this gene is modulated by cytokines in natural killer and T cells. The gene product is thought to play a role in apoptosis but the specific role has not yet been determined. Two transcripts encoding different isoforms have been identified.

Interactions 
PDCD4 has been shown to interact with RPS13, ribosomal protein L5,  p62, LC3 and Ubiquitin [9]

References 

 9.  Manirujjaman M, Ozaki I, Murata Y, Guo J, Xia J, Nishioka K, Perveen R,Takahashi H,  Anzai K, Matsuhashi S (2020). "Degradation of the Tumor Suppressor PDCD4 Is Impaired by the Suppression of p62/SQSTM1 and Autophagy". Cells. 9(1): 218. doi.org/10.3390/cells9010218.

Further reading